The New South Wales Institute for Educational Research Award for Outstanding Educational Research is awarded annually by the New South Wales Institute for Educational Research to recognize outstanding individuals who have produced outstanding doctoral theses in educational research.  The decision to introduce the awards system was made at the Annual General Meeting of the Institute in 1971 and the awards scheme itself commenced in 1972. Rebecca Fleming writes in the history of the Institute that "the research awards have served and continue to serve as a tangible way in which the Institute can recognize high quality educational research". Recent awardees include Professor Anne Bamford, Mr William Chivers, Dr Arthur Michael-Kelly, Dr James Page, Dr Tai Peseta, Professor Wayne Sawyer, Dr Kerry-Ann O'Sullivan, and Dr Ruth Wajnryb.

References

Sources 
 

Awards established in 1971
Education awards